The 1970 Arkansas Razorbacks football team represented the University of Arkansas in the Southwest Conference (SWC) during the 1970 NCAA University Division football season. In their 13th year under head coach Frank Broyles, the Razorbacks compiled a 9–2 record (6–1 against SWC opponents), finished in second place behind Texas in the SWC, and outscored all opponents by a combined total of 402 to 144.  The team finished the season ranked #11 in the final AP Poll and #12 in the final UPI Coaches Poll.

Tackle Dick Bumpas was a consensus All-American for Arkansas in 1970, with Chuck Dicus also earning first-team honors. Bill McClard averaged 7.3 points per game from the kicking position, the best in the nation for 1970. McClard converted on 50 of 51 extra points and 10 of 15 field goals. McClard connected on a 60-yard field goal against the Mustangs of SMU. This is the third-longest field goal in Arkansas history. Quarterback Bill Montgomery completed 80% of his pass attempts (12 of 15) against Oklahoma State, tied for sixth-best in Arkansas history in that category. Arkansas gained 658 yards (296 pass 362 rush) against TCU, the third most in the history of the Razorbacks.

Hours after losing 42-7 at Texas, the Razorbacks' bowl window slammed shut when LSU routed Ole Miss 61-17 to clinch the Southeastern Conference championship and an Orange Bowl bid vs. Big Eight Conference champion Nebraska. The Orange Bowl agreed to take the Southwest Conference runner-up if LSU lost either of its last two games vs. Tulane and Ole Miss. The Tigers defeated the Green Wave 26-14 one week prior to its destruction of the Rebels. By making that deal, the Razorbacks withdrew themselves from consideration from lower-tier bowl games such as the Bluebonnet, which took 6-5 Alabama to face Oklahoma, or the Sun, which took the Razorbacks' SWC rival, Texas Tech, a 24-10 loser to Arkansas in Lubbock, to play Georgia Tech.

Schedule

Roster

Team players in the NFL

References

Arkansas
Arkansas Razorbacks football seasons
Arkansas Razorbacks football